Aathal is a railway station in the Swiss canton of Zürich and municipality of Seegräben. The station is located on the Wallisellen to Rapperswil via Uster line and close to the Aathal Dinosaur Museum.

Service 
The station is served by Zürich S-Bahn route S14. During weekends, there is also a nighttime S-Bahn service (SN5) offered by ZVV. There is a shuttle-bus between Aathal railway station and Jucker Farm in Seegräben.

Summary of all S-Bahn services:

 Zürich S-Bahn:
 : half-hourly service to  via , and to  via .
 Nighttime S-Bahn (only during weekends):

History 
There have been two generations of railway station at Aathal, the result of a realignment of the line to the south.

References

External links 
 

Railway stations in the canton of Zürich
Swiss Federal Railways stations
Seegräben